The 2006 AFC Futsal Championship qualification was held in April 2006 to determine 4 spots to the final tournament in Uzbekistan. The top 11 teams of the 2005 AFC Futsal Championship, and the host nation for the 2006 competition, receive automatic byes to Finals.

Groups

Group A

Group B

Qualifiers

Host nation

2005 tournament

Qualification

References

 RSSSF

AFC Futsal Championship qualification
Qualification
International futsal competitions hosted by Malaysia